The 2017–18 FIU Panthers men's basketball team represented Florida International University during the 2017–18 NCAA Division I men's basketball season. The Panthers, led by fifth-year head coach Anthony Evans, played their home games at FIU Arena in Miami, Florida as members of Conference USA. They finished the season 14–18, 8–10 in C-USA play to finish in a tie for seventh place. They lost in the first round of the C-USA tournament to Southern Miss.

On April 2, 2018, FIU fired head coach Anthony Evans after five seasons. On April 20, the school announced VCU associate head coach Jeremy Ballard was hired as the new head coach.

Previous season 
The Panthers finished the 2016–17 season 7–24, 3–15 in C-USA play to finish in 13th place. They failed to qualify for the C-USA tournament.

Offseason

Departures

Incoming transfers

Recruiting class of 2017

Roster

Schedule and results

|-
!colspan=9 style=| Non-conference regular season

|-
!colspan=12 style=| Conference USA regular season

|-
!colspan=12 style=| Conference USA tournament

References

FIU Panthers men's basketball seasons
Florida International
FIU Panthers men's b
FIU Panthers men's b